Umetić is a village in the Donji Kukuruzari municipality in central Croatia. It is connected by the D30 highway.

Geography
Umetić is located in Banovina.

History
The region was held by Krajina Serbs during the Croatian War of Independence.

Demographics
2011: 73 inhabitants.
1991: 136 inhabitants.

Notable people
Svetozar Boroević

References

Populated places in Sisak-Moslavina County